Lot 49 is a township in Queens County, Prince Edward Island, Canada.  It is part of Bedford Parish. Lot 49 was awarded to Gabriel Christie and James Stephenson in the 1767 land lottery, and was sold to merchant Robert Clark in 1775.

References

49
Geography of Queens County, Prince Edward Island